Regensburg Hauptbahnhof is the main railway station in the city of Regensburg in southern Germany.

Location 
Regensburg Hauptbahnhof is located on the southern edge of the old city (Altstadt) in the immediate vicinity of Schloss St. Emmeram. In front of the station building are a taxi rank and the regional bus station. A short distance away is the central public transport hub known as Bustreff Albertstraße. The station has numerous shops; since its renovation in 2004 the overbridge also enables access to the Regensburg Arcade shopping centre south of the station tracks. At the site there are 177 car parking bays and stands for 300 bicycles.

History 

Regensburg was connected to the railway network relatively late; although the first line in Bavaria opened in 1835, it took until 1859 for the Bavarian Eastern Railway (Königlich privilegirte Aktiengesellschaft der bayerischen Ostbahnen) to link this east Bavarian metropolis with Nuremberg and Munich, the first line to be built going via Amberg. In 1860 Regensburg was connected to Passau; in 1873 a direct line to Nuremberg was opened; and this was followed by a connection to Ingolstadt in 1874.

The first station building was built between 1859 and 1864 at the southern end of Maximilianstraße to plans by architect Heinrich von Hügel, its great length, twin towers and five-arched portal reflecting the influence of the Italian renaissance. The building was torn down in 1888 and replaced by a new building in the contemporary style of the Gründerzeit. This second station building was destroyed in World War II; its successor was finished in 1955 and renovated in 2004.

After just under five years of construction, a new signal box went into service at the Hauptbahnhof in spring 1988. At a cost of 24 million DM it replaced eight old signal boxes that had been repaired at the end of the Second World War. Plans for the replacement began in 1981. 180 sets of points and 220 signals in the marshalling yard and main station are controlled by the new box; the 9-metre-long control panel was designed for an expansion of the area to be controlled. For the first time in the history of the Deutsche Bundesbahn, time signals were no longer controlled by cable but by long wave transmissions from the Mainflingen transmitter.

The marshalling yard, which is west of the main passenger station and adjacent to it, has been closed and is to be demolished.

Operational usage 

Regensburg is situated at the crossing of the main line railway lines Munich-Hof and Nuremberg-Passau; smaller branch lines connect Regensburg to Ulm and Prague.

Regensburg today sees about 200 trains per day, most of them operated by Deutsche Bahn AG, though some regional services are operated by Vogtlandbahn. The following is a summary:

The platform announcements which inform travellers of the arrival and departure of trains at Regensburg Hauptbahnhof and also welcome alighting passengers were digitalised in July 2008.

References

Further reading

External links
Virtual tour 

Regensburg Hauptbahnhof
Hauptbahnhof
Railway stations in Germany opened in 1892